Thompson Creek is a creek in San Jose, California, which flows entirely in the Evergreen district of East San Jose. Thompson Creek is a tributary to Coyote Creek via Lower Silver Creek. The creek was one of several that fed into the marshy area known as Laguna Socayre, where the Lake Cunningham flood retention basin is now.

References

Rivers of Santa Clara County, California